John Dorrance may refer to:
 John Thompson Dorrance, American chemist who discovered a method to create condensed soup
 John Dorrance III, American-born Irish billionaire businessman and Campbell's Soup heir